Sami Khayat (Arabic: سامي خياط) is a Lebanese francophone theater comic actor, director and writer. He is considered one of the pioneers of comic theater in Lebanon.

He began his artistic career with a play he presented in 1960, entitled Molière Hugo and Sofocole. His plays were classified as satirical lyric theater, known as the chansonnier. He duetted with Pierre Chamassian from 1973 until 1986, and once again in 2013.

In 2020, he was awarded the French Medal of Arts and Literature with the rank of Officer, in recognition of his theatrical work in the French and Franco-Lebanese languages for 60 years, which he did not stop even in the midst of the Civil war, and honored on several occasions in Lebanon by The Gebran Tueni Foundation and Fakhruddin Foundation.

Work 
His works include:

 Super-Choir (1978)
 Yes for Elias يس فور لياس
 Abu Clips أبو كليبس (1980)
 Baabda Boom بعبدا بوم (1981)
 Finito (1982-1983)
 Star Epidemi ستار إيبيديميو, in Kulturzentrum (Jounieh), 2007
 Mine Dir Rien مين دريان
 Kuma Sava كوما سافا
 Taisez Vous - 2
 Karafe قرف

See also 

 Pierre Chamasian
 Théâtre de Dix-Heures
 Mario Bassil

References 

Living people
Lebanese male actors
Lebanese comedians
Year of birth missing (living people)